In nuclear fusion power research, the plasma-facing material (or materials) (PFM) is any material used to construct the plasma-facing components (PFC), those components exposed to the plasma within which nuclear fusion occurs, and particularly the material used for the lining the first wall or divertor region of the reactor vessel.

Plasma-facing materials for fusion reactor designs must support the overall steps for energy generation, these include:
Generating heat through fusion,
Capturing heat in the first wall, 
Transferring heat at a faster rate than capturing heat.
Generating electricity.

In addition PFMs have to operate over the lifetime of a fusion reactor vessel by handling the harsh environmental conditions, such as:
 Ion bombardment causing physical and chemical sputtering and therefore erosion.
 Ion implantation causing displacement damage and chemical composition changes
 High-heat fluxes (e.g. 10 MW/m) due to ELMS and other transients.
 Limited tritium codeposition and sequestration.
 Stable thermomechanical properties under operation.
 Limited number of negative nuclear transmutation effects

Currently, fusion reactor research focuses on improving efficiency and reliability in heat generation and capture and on raising the rate of transfer. Generating electricity from heat is beyond the scope of current research, due to existing efficient heat-transfer cycles, such as heating water to operate steam turbines that drive electrical generators.

Current reactor designs are fueled by deuterium-tritium (D-T) fusion reactions, which produce high-energy neutrons that can damage the first wall, however, high-energy neutrons (14.1 MeV) are needed for blanket and Tritium breeder operation. Tritium is not a naturally abundant isotope due to its short half-life, therefore for a fusion D-T reactor it will need to be bred by the nuclear reaction of lithium (Li), boron (B), or beryllium (Be) isotopes with high-energy neutrons that collide within the first wall.

Requirements
Most magnetic confinement fusion devices (MCFD) consist of several key components in their technical designs, including:
Magnet system: confines the deuterium-tritium fuel in the form of plasma and in the shape of a torus.
Vacuum vessel: contains the core fusion plasma and maintains fusion conditions.
First wall: positioned between the plasma and magnets in order to protect outer vessel components from radiation damage.
Cooling system: removes heat from the confinement and transfers heat from the first wall.
The core fusion plasma must not actually touch the first wall. ITER and many other current and projected fusion experiments, particularly those of the tokamak and stellarator designs, use intense magnetic fields in an attempt to achieve this, although plasma instability problems remain. Even with stable plasma confinement, however, the first wall material would be exposed to a neutron flux higher than in any current nuclear power reactor, which leads to two key problems in selecting the material:
It must withstand this neutron flux for a sufficient period of time to be economically viable.
It must not become sufficiently radioactive so as to produce unacceptable amounts of nuclear waste when lining replacement or plant decommissioning eventually occurs.

The lining material must also:
Allow the passage of a large heat flux.
Be compatible with intense and fluctuating magnetic fields.
Minimize contamination of the plasma.
Be produced and replaced at a reasonable cost.

Some critical plasma-facing components, such as and in particular the divertor, are typically protected by a different material than that used for the major area of the first wall.

Proposed materials

Materials currently in use or under consideration include:
Silicon carbide
Boron carbide
Graphite
Carbon fibre composite (CFC)
Beryllium
Tungsten
Molybdenum
Lithium

Multi-layer tiles of several of these materials are also being considered and used, for example:
A thin molybdenum layer on graphite tiles.
A thin tungsten layer on graphite tiles.
A tungsten layer on top of a molybdenum layer on graphite tiles.
A boron carbide layer on top of CFC tiles.
A liquid lithium layer on graphite tiles.
A liquid lithium layer on top of a boron layer on graphite tiles.
A liquid lithium layer on tungsten-based solid PFC surfaces or divertors.

Graphite was used for the first wall material of the Joint European Torus (JET) at its startup (1983), in Tokamak à configuration variable (1992) and in National Spherical Torus Experiment (NSTX, first plasma 1999).

Beryllium was used to reline JET in 2009 in anticipation of its proposed use in ITER.

Tungsten is used for the divertor in JET, and will be used for the divertor in ITER. It is also used for the first wall in ASDEX Upgrade. Graphite tiles plasma sprayed with tungsten were used for the ASDEX Upgrade divertor. Studies of tungsten in the divertor have been conducted at the DIII-D facility. These experiments utilized two rings of tungsten isotopes embedded in the lower divertor to characterize erosion tungsten during operation.
Molybdenum is used for the first wall material in Alcator C-Mod (1991).

Liquid lithium (LL) was used to coat the PFC of the Tokamak Fusion Test Reactor in the Lithium Tokamak Experiment (TFTR, 1996).

Considerations
Development of satisfactory plasma-facing materials is one of the key problems still to be solved by current programs.

Plasma-facing materials can be measured for performance in terms of:
Power production for a given reactor size.
Cost to generate electricity.
Self-sufficiency of tritium production.
Availability of materials.
Design and fabrication of the PFC.
Safety in waste disposal and in maintenance.
The International Fusion Materials Irradiation Facility (IFMIF) will particularly address this. Materials developed using IFMIF will be used in DEMO, the proposed successor to ITER.

French Nobel laureate in physics Pierre-Gilles de Gennes said of nuclear fusion, "We say that we will put the sun into a box. The idea is pretty. The problem is, we don't know how to make the box."

Recent developments
Solid plasma-facing materials are known to be susceptible to damage under large heat loads and high neutron flux. If damaged, these solids can contaminate the plasma and decrease plasma confinement stability. In addition, radiation can leak through defects in the solids and contaminate outer vessel components.

Liquid metal plasma-facing components that enclose the plasma have been proposed to address challenges in the PFC. In particular, liquid lithium (LL) has been confirmed to have various properties that are attractive for fusion reactor performance.

Lithium
Lithium (Li) is an alkali metal with a low Z (atomic number). Li has a low first ionization energy of ~5.4 eV and is highly chemically reactive with ion species found in the plasma of fusion reactor cores. In particular, Li readily forms stable lithium compounds with hydrogen isotopes, oxygen, carbon, and other impurities found in D-T plasma.

The fusion reaction of D-T produces charged and neutral particles in the plasma. The charged particles remain magnetically confined to the plasma. The neutral particles are not magnetically confined and will move toward the boundary between the hotter plasma and the colder PFC. Upon reaching the first wall, both neutral particles and charged particles that escaped the plasma become cold neutral particles in gaseous form. An outer edge of cold neutral gas is then “recycled”, or mixed, with the hotter plasma. A temperature gradient between the cold neutral gas and the hot plasma is believed to be the principal cause of anomalous electron and ion transport from the magnetically confined plasma. As recycling decreases, the temperature gradient decreases and plasma confinement stability increases. With better conditions for fusion in the plasma, the reactor performance increases.

Initial use of lithium in 1990s was motivated by a need for a low-recycling PFC. In 1996, ~ 0.02 grams of lithium coating was added to the PFC of TFTR, resulting in the fusion power output and the fusion plasma confinement to improve by a factor of two. On the first wall, lithium reacted with neutral particles to produce stable lithium compounds, resulting in low-recycling of cold neutral gas. In addition, lithium contamination in the plasma tended to be well below 1%.

Since 1996, these results have been confirmed by a large number of magnetic confinement fusion devices (MCFD) that have also used lithium in their PFC, for example:
TFTR (US), CDX-U (2005)/LTX(2010) (US), CPD (Japan), HT-7 (China), EAST (China), FTU (Italy).
NSTX (US), T-10 (Russia), T-11M (Russia), TJ-II (Spain), RFX (Italy).

The primary energy generation in fusion reactor designs is from the absorption of high-energy neutrons. Results from these MCFD highlight additional benefits of liquid lithium coatings for reliable energy generation, including:
Absorb high-energy, or fast-moving, neutrons. About 80% of the energy produced in a fusion reaction of D-T is in the kinetic energy of the newly produced neutron.
Convert kinetic energies of absorbed neutrons into heat on the first wall. The heat that is produced on the first wall can then be removed by coolants in ancillary systems that generate electricity.
Self-sufficient breeding of tritium by nuclear reaction with absorbed neutrons. Neutrons of varying kinetic energies will drive tritium-breeding reactions.

Liquid lithium
Newer developments in liquid lithium are currently being tested, for example:
Coatings made of increasingly complex liquid lithium compounds.
Multi-layered coatings of LL, B, F, and other low-Z metals.
Higher density coatings of LL for use on PFC designed for greater heat loads and neutron flux.

See also
International Fusion Materials Irradiation Facility#Background information
Lithium Tokamak Experiment

References

External links
Max Planck Institute project page on PFM
13th International Workshop on Plasma-Facing Materials and Components for Fusion Applications / 1st International Conference on Fusion Energy Materials Science

Materials science
Fusion power